Ağaməmmədli is a village and municipality in the Imishli Rayon of Azerbaijan.  It has a population of 1,060.

References 

Populated places in Imishli District